Eastern Pannonia may refer to:

 in geography, eastern regions of the Pannonian Basin
 in ancient history, eastern Panonnian province, known as Pannonia Inferior, divided into:
 late Roman Province of Pannonia Valeria, and
 late Roman Province of Pannonia Secunda
 in early medieval history, eastern regions of the March of Pannonia

See also
 Pannonia (disambiguation)